The Battle of Crotoy was a naval battle which occurred on 25 June 1347 at the mouth of the Somme off the Le Crotoy, when a French fleet of 40 ships gathered in attempted to relieve Calais, where an English army under the command of King Edward III of England was besieging the French town during the Edwardian phase of the Hundred Years' War.

An English fleet commanded by William de Bohun, Earl of Northampton and Laurence Hastings, Earl of Pembroke defeated the French fleet.

Citations

References
 

1347 in England
1347 in France
Conflicts in 1347
Hundred Years' War
14th-century military history of the Kingdom of England
Naval battles involving England
Naval battles involving France
Naval battles of the Hundred Years' War